The Texas Trail Museum is a museum housed in a building which was formerly the Power Plant/Fire House for the town of Pine Bluffs in Wyoming. The museum's mission is to preserve and restore the heritage of the Frontier crossroads area (Eastern Laramie County, Wyoming) for future generations, through displays and education.

History
When first formed in 1986, needing a place to display artifacts, the Board negotiated with the Town of Pine Bluffs during the weeks leading up to the Town's centennial. On September 16, 1986, by Resolution 86-16, signed by Timothy T. Connor, Mayor and Dema Jo Gilbert, Clerk, the Town leased to the Texas Trail Museum: "... a non-profit organization in the state of Wyoming, a building known as the 'Old Power Plant,' situated on the northwest corner of Market Street and Third Street in the Town of Pine Bluffs, Wyoming for the sum of one dollar ($1.00) per year."

Exhibits
The museum is a -acre complex, which includes:

 Main Exhibition Hall - includes Old West artifacts
 Agriculture and Transportation Building 
 Saint Mary's Catholic Church
 Muddy Creek School, the first one-room schoolhouse in southeastern Laramie County
 Bowser Homestead Cottage, an example of how early homesteaders lived
 Railroad displays, including a Union Pacific Railroad caboose, a switchman's shack and a telegraph shed
 Brodine-Walker Boarding House, which had been run by local families who rented rooms to railroad crewmen between assignments and travelers

The museum complex displays artifacts of the 19th and 20th century, including a 1938 fire engine, twin diesel engines that provided electricity for Pine Bluffs from 1937–1960, a teepee of the type used by American Indians who inhabited the area around Pine Bluffs a century ago. Many teepee rings have been discovered in the Bluffs south of town.

References

History museums in Wyoming
Museums established in 1986
Museums in Laramie County, Wyoming
1986 establishments in Wyoming